Dominique Koster (born 3 January 1977) is a retired South African sprinter who specialized in the 400 metres.

Her biggest outing was the 2005 World Championships, where she competed on the South African 4 × 400 metres relay team. At the 2002 African Championships she finished seventh in the 200 metres and won a gold medal in the 4 × 100 metres relay.

Her personal best time was 53.97 seconds, achieved in April 2002 in Pretoria.

References

1977 births
Living people
South African female sprinters
World Athletics Championships athletes for South Africa
20th-century South African women
21st-century South African women